Duck first appeared in Lloyd's Register in the supplement to the volume for 1813. She had been launched at Stettin and had undergone a thorough repair in 1812. 

The  captured Duck off the coast of Africa. Peacock left the crew at Teneriffe, or Fuerteventura. Captain Stevenson reported that the capture had occurred on 2 September 1814 about four miles off land. Duck had been sailing from Port Cabras to Oratava and was carrying 100 tons of barilla. Peacock cut down Ducks mast and then sank her. The entry for Duck in the 1815 volume of LR carried the annotation "captured".

Citations

Age of Sail merchant ships of England
1812 ships
Captured ships